Louis Comfort Tiffany (February 18, 1848 – January 17, 1933) was an American artist and designer who worked in the decorative arts and is best known for his work in stained glass. He is the American artist most associated with the Art Nouveau and Aesthetic movements. He was affiliated with a prestigious collaborative of designers known as the Associated Artists, which included Lockwood de Forest, Candace Wheeler, and Samuel Colman. Tiffany designed stained glass windows and lamps, glass mosaics, blown glass, ceramics, jewellery, enamels, and metalwork. He was the first design director at his family company, Tiffany & Co., founded by his father Charles Lewis Tiffany.



Early life

Louis Comfort Tiffany was born in New York City, the son of Charles Lewis Tiffany, founder of Tiffany and Company, and Harriet Olivia Avery Young. He attended school at Pennsylvania Military Academy in  West Chester, Pennsylvania, and Eagleswood Military Academy in Perth Amboy, New Jersey. His first artistic training was as a painter, studying under George Inness in Eagleswood, New Jersey and Samuel Colman in Irvington, New York. He also studied at the National Academy of Design in New York City in 1866–67 and with salon painter Leon-Adolphe-Auguste Belly in 1868–69. Belly's landscape paintings had a great influence on Tiffany.

Career

Tiffany started out as a painter, but became interested in glassmaking from about 1875 and worked at several glasshouses in Brooklyn between then and 1878. In 1879 he joined with Candace Wheeler, Samuel Colman, and Lockwood de Forest to form Louis Comfort Tiffany and Associated American Artists. The business was short-lived, lasting only four years. The group made designs for wallpaper, furniture, and textiles. He later opened his own glass factory in Corona, New York, determined to provide designs that improved the quality of contemporary glass. Tiffany's leadership and talent, as well as his father's money and connections, led this business to thrive.

In 1881 Tiffany did the interior design of the Mark Twain House in Hartford, Connecticut, which still remains, but the new firm's most notable work came in 1882 when President Chester Alan Arthur refused to move into the White House until it had been redecorated. He commissioned Tiffany, who had begun to make a name for himself in New York society for the firm's interior design work, to redo the state rooms, which Arthur found charmless. Tiffany worked on the East Room, the Blue Room, the Red Room, the State Dining Room, and the Entrance Hall, refurnishing, repainting in decorative patterns, installing newly designed mantelpieces, changing to wallpaper with dense patterns, and, of course, adding Tiffany glass to gaslight fixtures and windows and adding an opalescent floor-to-ceiling glass screen in the Entrance Hall. The Tiffany screen and other Victorian additions were all removed in the Roosevelt renovations of 1902, which restored the White House interiors to Federal style in keeping with its architecture.

A desire to concentrate on art in glass led to the breakup of the firm in 1885 when Tiffany chose to establish his own glassmaking firm that same year. The first Tiffany Glass Company was incorporated December 1, 1885, and in 1902 became known as the Tiffany Studios.

In the beginning of his career, Tiffany used cheap jelly jars and bottles because they had the mineral impurities that finer glass lacked. When he was unable to convince fine glassmakers to leave the impurities in, he began making his own glass. Tiffany used opalescent glass in a variety of colors and textures to create a unique style of stained glass. Tiffany acquired Stanford Bray's patent (https://patents.google.com/patent/US349424A/en)for the "copper foil" technique, which, by edging each piece of cut glass in copper foil and soldering the whole together to create his windows and lamps, made possible a level of detail previously unknown. This can be contrasted with the method of painting in enamels or glass paint on colorless glass, and then setting the glass pieces in lead channels, that had been the dominant method of creating stained glass for hundreds of years in Europe.

The First Presbyterian Church building of 1905 in Pittsburgh, Pennsylvania, is said to be unique in that it uses Tiffany windows that partially make use of painted glass. Use of the colored glass itself to create stained glass pictures was motivated by the ideals of the Arts and Crafts movement and its leader William Morris in England. Fellow artists and glassmakers Oliver Kimberly and Frank Duffner, founders of the Duffner and Kimberly Company and John La Farge were Tiffany's chief competitors in this new American style of stained glass. Tiffany, Duffner and Kimberly, along with La Farge, had learned their craft at the same glasshouses in Brooklyn in the late 1870s.

In 1889 at the Paris Exposition, Tiffany was said to have been "overwhelmed" by the glass work of Émile Gallé, French Art Nouveau artisan. He also met artist Alphonse Mucha.

In 1893, Tiffany built a new factory called the Stourbridge Glass Company, later called Tiffany Glass Furnaces, which was located in Corona, Queens, New York, hiring the Englishman Arthur J. Nash to oversee it. In 1893, his company also introduced the term Favrile in conjunction with his first production of blown glass at his new glass factory. Some early examples of his lamps were exhibited in the 1893 World's Fair in Chicago. At the Exposition Universelle (1900) in Paris, he won a gold medal with his stained glass windows The Four Seasons

He trademarked Favrile  (from the old French word for handmade) on November 13, 1894. He later used this word to apply to all of his glass, enamel and pottery. Tiffany's first commercially produced lamps date from around 1895. Much of his company's production was in making stained glass windows and Tiffany lamps, but his company designed a complete range of interior decorations. At its peak, his factory employed more than 300 artisans. Recent scholarship led by Rutgers professor Martin Eidelberg suggests that a team of talented single women designers – sometimes referred to as the "Tiffany Girls" – led by Clara Driscoll played a big role in designing many of the floral patterns on the famous Tiffany lamp as well as for other creations.

Tiffany interiors also made considerable use of mosaics. The mosaics workshop, largely staffed by women, was overseen until 1898 by the Swiss-born sculptor and designer Jacob Adolphus Holzer.

In 1902, Tiffany became the first design director for Tiffany & Co., the jewelry company founded by his father.

1911 saw the installation of an enormous glass curtain fabricated for the Palacio de Bellas Artes in Mexico City. It is considered by some to be a masterpiece.

Tiffany used all his skills in the design of his own house, the 84-room Laurelton Hall, in the village of Laurel Hollow, on Long Island, New York, completed in 1905. Later this estate was donated to his foundation for art students along with 60 acres (243,000 m2) of land, sold in 1949, and destroyed by a fire in 1957.

Personal life
Louis married Mary Woodbridge Goddard (c1850-1884) on May 15, 1872, in Norwich, Connecticut and had the following children:

Mary Woodbridge Tiffany (1873–1963) who married Graham Lusk;
Charles Louis Tiffany I (1874–1874);
Charles Louis Tiffany II (1878–1947) who married Katrina Brandes Ely; 
Hilda Goddard Tiffany (1879–1908), the youngest.

After the death of his wife, he married Louise Wakeman Knox (1851–1904) on November 9, 1886. They had the following children:

Louise Comfort Tiffany (1887–1974), who married Rodman Drake DeKay Gilder;
Julia DeForest Tiffany (1887–1973), who married Gurdon S. Parker then married Francis Minot Weld;
Annie Olivia Tiffany (1888–1892); and
Dorothy Trimble Tiffany (1891–1979), who, as Dorothy Burlingham, later became a noted psychoanalyst and lifelong friend and partner of Anna Freud.

        
Tiffany died on January 17, 1933, and is buried in Green-Wood Cemetery in Brooklyn, New York.

Tiffany is the great-grandfather of investor George Gilder.

Societies
 American Watercolor Society
 Architectural League
 Chevalier of the Legion of Honour in 1900
 Imperial Society of Fine Arts (Tokyo)
 National Academy of Design in 1880
 New York Society of Fine Arts
 Société Nationale des Beaux-Arts (Paris)
 Society of American Artists in 1877

Source:

Awards and honors
 1893: 44 medals, World Columbian Exposition (Chicago)
 1900: gold medal, Chevalier of the Legion of Honour (France)
 1900: grand prix, Paris Exposition
 1901: grand prix, St. Petersburg Exposition
 1901: gold medal, Buffalo Exposition
 1901: gold medal, Dresden Exposition
 1902: gold medal and special diploma, Turin Exposition
 1904: gold medal, Louisiana Purchase Exposition in St. Louis
 1907: gold medal, Jamestown Exposition
 1909: grand prize, Seattle Exposition
 1915: gold medal, Panama Exposition
 1926: gold medal, Philadelphia Sesquicentennial Exposition

Source:

Collections
The Charles Hosmer Morse Museum of American Art in Winter Park, Florida houses the world's most comprehensive collection of the works of Louis Comfort Tiffany, including Tiffany jewelry, pottery, paintings, art glass, leaded-glass windows, lamps, and the Tiffany Chapel he designed for the 1893 World's Columbian Exposition in Chicago. After the close of the exposition, a benefactor purchased the entire chapel for installation in the crypt of the Cathedral of Saint John the Divine, New York in New York City. As construction on the cathedral continued, the chapel fell into disuse, and in 1916, Tiffany removed the bulk of it to Laurelton Hall. After a 1957 fire, Hugh McKean (a former art student in 1930 at Laurelton Hall) and his wife Jeannette Genius McKean rescued the chapel, which now occupies an entire wing of the Morse Museum which they founded. Many glass panels from Laurelton Hall are also there; for many years some were on display in local restaurants and businesses in Central Florida.  Some were replaced by full-scale color transparencies after the museum opened.

A major exhibit at New York's Metropolitan Museum of Art on Laurelton Hall opened in November 2006. An exhibit at the New-York Historical Society in 2007 featured new information about the women who worked for Tiffany and their contribution to designs credited to Tiffany; the Society holds and exhibits a major collection of Tiffany's work.  In addition, since 1995 the Queens Museum of Art has featured a permanent collection of Tiffany objects, which continues Tiffany's presence in Corona, Queens where the company's studios were once located. Reid Memorial Presbyterian Church in Richmond, Indiana has a collection of 62 Tiffany windows which are still their original placements, but the church is deteriorating and in jeopardy.

In 1906, Tiffany created stained glass windows for the Stanford White-designed Madison Square Presbyterian Church located on Madison Avenue in Manhattan, New York City. The church was Tiffany's place of worship, and was torn down in 1919 after the Metropolitan Life Insurance Company bought the land to build their new headquarters.  Tiffany had inserted a clause in his contract stipulating that if the church were ever to be demolished then ownership of the windows would revert to him.

Tiffany enjoyed staying at the Mission Inn in Riverside, California, and had become friends with the founder of the Mission Inn, Frank Augustus Miller, so, after meeting with Miller in New York, Tiffany shipped the windows to the Mission Inn; they arrived there in 1924, and were stored until the inn's St. Francis Chapel  was completed in 1931.  There are six rectangular windows and a 104” diameter window in the rear of the chapel, as well as another 104” diameter window is in the Galeria next to the chapel.  A smaller window entitled “Monk At The Organ” featuring a Franciscan friar, is in St Cecelia's Chapel, a wedding chapel, and is engraved with Tiffany's signature. The St Francis Chapel was designed with the intent of prominently displaying Tiffany's windows.

The Arlington Street Church in Boston has 16 Tiffany windows of a set of 20, designed by Frederick Wilson (1858–1932), Tiffany's chief designer for ecclesiastical windows. They were gradually installed between 1889 and 1929. The church archives include designs for 4 additional windows, which were never commissioned due to financial constraints caused by the Great Depression. When funds again became available, Tiffany Studios had gone out of business and its stockpile of glass had been dispersed and lost, ending the prospect of completing the set. Also in the Back Bay district of Boston is Frederick Ayer Mansion, one of three surviving examples of Tiffany interiors, and the only surviving building also possessing exterior mosaics designed by Tiffany.
              
The Pine Street Baptist Church in Providence, Rhode Island was opened in 1917 at Lloyd and Wayland Street as Central Baptist and in 2003, became known as Community Church of Providence. Between 1917 and 2018 the church featured a large Tiffany stained glass memorial to Frederick W. Hartwell that was created by Agnes F. Northrop and entitled "Light in Heaven and Earth". The complex work, considered "one of the largest and finest landscape windows ever produced by Tiffany Studios", largely was overlooked in the community. In 2018, the church sold the window to the Art Institute of Chicago. After conservation and preparation it will be displayed prominently as the Hartwell Memorial Window.

Significant collections of Tiffany windows outside the United States are the 17 windows in the former Erskine and American United Church, now part of the Montreal Museum of Fine Arts in Montreal, Canada, and the two windows in the American Church in Paris, on the Quai d'Orsay, which have been classified as National Monuments by the French government; these were commissioned by Rodman Wanamaker in 1901 for the original American Church building on the right bank of the Seine.

The Haworth Art Gallery in Accrington, England contains a collection of more than 140 examples of the work of Louis Comfort Tiffany, including vases, tiles, lamps, and mosaics. The collection, which claims to be the largest collection of publicly owned Tiffany glass outside of the United States, contains a fine example of an Aquamarine vase and the noted Sulphur Crested Cockatoos mosaic.

Gallery

See also
 Tiffany glass
 The Louis Comfort Tiffany Foundation
 Art Nouveau glass art

References
Notes

Sources
 Tiffany, Louis Comfort & de Kay, Charles. The Art Work of Louis C. Tiffany. Doubleday, Page & Co, New York, 1916

Further reading
 Couldrey, Vivienne. The Art of Louis Comfort Tiffany. Bloomsbury Publications, London, 1989,  
 Duncan, Alastair. Tiffany Windows. Thames & Hudson, London, 1980, 

 Koch, Robert H. Louis C. Tiffany – Rebel in Glass. 3rd Ed., Crown Publishers Inc, New York, 1982, ASIN B 0007DRJK0
 Logan, Ernest Edwin. The Church That Was Twice Born: A History of the First Presbyterian Church Of Pittsburgh, Pennsylvania 1773–1973. Pickwick-Morcraft, Pittsburgh, Pa., 1973
 Rago, David. "Tiffany Pottery" in American Art Pottery. Knickerbocker Press, New York, 1997

External links

Tiffany Digital Collection from the Metropolitan Museum of Art Libraries 
 Tiffany Treasures: Favrile Glass from Special Collections. Information on the 2009–2010 exhibition at The Corning Museum of Glass.
 Louis Comfort Tiffany – Artist and Businessman
 
 Louis Comfort Tiffany objects in the collection of the Cooper-Hewitt, National Design Museum
 Louis Comfort Tiffany Pictorial Histories
 Press Release on Metropolitan 2006–07 exhibition about Laurelton Hall
 Tiffany and The Associated Artists' work on the Mark Twain House
 When Louis Tiffany Redesigned the White House
 Willard Memorial Chapel
 Virtual visit of Tiffany Glass exhibit at the Montreal Museum of Fine Arts (2010).
 Tiffany windows at Reid Memorial Presbyterian Church in Richmond, Indiana.
 Ayer Mansion, Back Bay, Boston (now Bayridge Residence and Cultural Center)
 Artwork by Louis Comfort Tiffany

1848 births
1933 deaths
American interior designers
Burials at Green-Wood Cemetery
Chevaliers of the Légion d'honneur
American jewelry designers
American people of English descent
Artists from New York City
American stained glass artists and manufacturers
Widener University alumni
Tiffany Studios
Tiffany & Co.
Art Nouveau designers
Orientalist painters
People from Laurel Hollow, New York
National Sculpture Society members
American glass artists